Jewels 17th Ring was a mixed martial arts (MMA) event held by promotion Jewels on  at Shinjuku Face in Kabukicho, Tokyo, Japan.

The event featured the semi-finals and final of the Jewels Featherweight Queen tournament, which determined the first featherweight (-48 kg) titleholder of the promotion. It also featured a Jewels lightweight queen championship match and the final of the Jewels Under-15 Amateur Kickboxing Tournament.

Background
At the conclusion of Jewels 16th Ring, the semi-final matchups were determined in the Jewels Featherweight Queen Grand Prix; a tournament that crowned the first featherweight queen champion of the promotion at Jewels 17th Ring. Naho Sugiyama would face Kikuyo Ishikawa in one semi-final and Misaki Takimoto would face Yukiko Seki in the other. The winners would then face each other for the championship later on the same card.

On , three bouts were announced for the card. Jewels lightweight queen champion Ayaka Hamasaki would defend her title in a rematch with Seo Hee Ham. Mei Yamaguchi would face Mika Nagano and Yasuko Tamada would face Sachiko Yamamoto in a Jewels Featherweight Queen GP reserve bout.

In professional MMA bouts, Shino VanHoose would face Asami Higa and Yuka Okumura would face Anna Saito. Miyako Mitsuhori would face Mai in a kickboxing match and Yukari Yamaguchi would face Nana Ichikawa in an amateur MMA fight.

The day before the event, all fighters made weight on their first attempt during the weigh-ins.

Event
Chihiro Imoto defeated Saya Ito by unanimous decision to win the Jewels Under-15 Amateur Kickboxing Tournament.

Misaki Takimoto defeated Yukiko Seki in the first Jewels Featherweight Queen GP semi-final and Naho Sugiyama defeated Kikuyo Ishikawa in the other. Sugiyama then defeated Takimoto by technical submission (armbar) in the tournament final to become the first Jewels featherweight queen champion.

In the main event, Ayaka Hamasaki defeated Seo Hee Ham by TKO (corner stoppage) after the first round when Ham was unable to continue due to a back injury.

Results

Opening card
1st opening fight: Jewels amateur kickboxing rules -48 kg, 2:00 x 2 rounds
 Mili Sasaki (Shobukai) vs.  Fuka Saito (Shakariki Dojo)
Sasaki defeated Saito by majority decision (20-20, 20-19, 20-19).

2nd opening fight: Jewels amateur rules, 4:00 x 1 round
 Yukari Yamaguchi (White Heart Karate Association) vs.  Nana Ichikawa (Freelance)
Yamaguchi defeated Ichikawa by technical submission (armbar) at 1:20 of round 1.

3rd opening fight: Jewels Under-15 Kickboxing Tournament final (-46 kg), Jewels amateur kickboxing rules, 2:00 x 2 rounds
 Chihiro Imoto (Kokushi Gym) vs.  Saya Ito (Shobukai)
Imoto defeated Ito by majority decision (20-19, 20-19, 19-19).

Main card
1st match: Jewels official rules -54 kg bout, 5:00 x 2 rounds
 Yuka Okumura (Soul Fighters Japan) vs.  Anna Saito (Fight Chix)
Okumura defeated Saito by submission (heel hook) at 4:41 of round 1.

2nd match: Jewels official rules -48 kg bout, 5:00 x 2 rounds
 Shino VanHoose (Paraestra Hachioji/Shobukai) vs.  Asami Higa (S-KEEP)
VanHoose defeated Higa by unanimous decision.

3rd match: Jewels Featherweight Queen GP 2011 semi-final A (-48 kg), Jewels official rules, 5:00 x 2 rounds
 Misaki Takimoto (Zendokai Yokohama) vs.  Yukiko Seki (Fight Chix)
Takimoto defeated Seki by unanimous decision.

4th match: Jewels Featherweight Queen GP 2011 semi-final B (-48 kg), Jewels official rules, 5:00 x 2 rounds
 Naho Sugiyama (Wajutsu Keishukai AKZA) vs.  Kikuyo Ishikawa (Reversal Gym Yokohama Ground Slam)
Sugiyama defeated Ishikawa by split decision.

5th match: Jewels Featherweight Queen GP 2011 reserve bout (-48 kg), Jewels official rules, 5:00 x 2 rounds
 Sachiko Yamamoto (Angura) vs.  Yasuko Tamada (AACC)
Yamamoto defeated Tamada by split decision.

6th match: Jewels official rules -52 kg bout, 5:00 x 2 rounds
 Emi Tomimatsu (Paraestra Matsudo) vs.  Rina Tomita (AACC)
Tomimatsu defeated Tomita by split decision.

7th match: Jewels kickboxing rules -49 kg bout, 2:00 x 3 rounds
 Mai (Kenshinjyuku) vs.  Miyako Mitsuhori (Y'ZD Gym)
Mai defeated Mitsuhori by unanimous decision (30-28, 30-28, 30-29).

8th match: Jewels kickboxing rules -52 kg bout, 2:00 x 3 rounds
 Miku Hayashi (Bungeling Bay Spirit) vs.  Kanomu Shisso (Team SO)
Hayashi defeated Shisso by unanimous decision (30-28, 30-28, 30-28).

9th match: Jewels official rules -52 kg bout, 5:00 x 2 rounds
 Emi Fujino (Wajutsu Keishukai GODS) vs.  Celine Haga (Team Hellboy Hansen)
Fujino defeated Haga by unanimous decision.

10th match: Jewels official rules -52 kg bout, 5:00 x 2 rounds
 Mei Yamaguchi (Freelance) vs.  Mika Nagano (Core)
Yamaguchi defeated Nagano by split decision.

11th match: Jewels Featherweight Queen GP 2011 final (-48 kg), Jewels official rules, 5:00 x 2 rounds
 Naho Sugiyama (Wajutsu Keishukai AKZA) vs.  Misaki Takimoto (Zendokai Yokohama)
Sugiyama defeated Takimoto by technical submission (armbar) at 4:09 of round 1 to become Jewels featherweight queen champion.

12th match: Jewels Lightweight Queen Championship (-52 kg), Jewels special rules, 5:00 x 3 rounds
 Ayaka Hamasaki (AACC) vs.  Seo Hee Ham (CMA Korea/Busan Team M.A.D.)
Hamasaki defeated Ham by TKO (corner stoppage) at 5:00 of round 1 to retain the Jewels lightweight queen championship.

References

External links
Official results at Jewels official blog 
Event results at Sherdog
Event results at God Bless the Ring 
Event results at Bout Review 

Jewels (mixed martial arts) events
2011 in mixed martial arts
Mixed martial arts in Japan
Sports competitions in Tokyo
2011 in Japanese sport